Cooling down (also known as limbering down or warming down) is the transition from intense physical activity to a more typical activity level. Depending on the intensity of the exercise, cooling down after a workout method, such as intense weightlifting, can involve a slow jog or walk.  

Cooling down allows the heart rate to return to its resting rate. Additionally cooling down may reduce dizziness for professional or serious athletes and vocal performers after strenuous workouts. 

Studies are currently inconclusive as to whether the process actually reduces delayed-onset muscle soreness and muscle soreness not caused by lactate production during intense exercise. Some have shown a weak correlation: however, the majority of recent studies discount the relationship.

Procedure
An effective cool-down after exercise involves a gradual, continuous decrease in exercise intensity, such as from a hard run to an easy jog to a brisk walk. The duration varies for different people, but 3–10 minutes is generally considered adequate for most people. Stretching, especially static stretching allows the muscles to be elongated and lengthened. 

Rehydration is an essential part of the procedure and should be done either during stretching and light intensity or after these steps. Refueling the body with water and electrolyte-rich drinks, like sports drinks, will keep the body hydrated.

Stretching 

Static stretching is the appropriate form of stretching to aid in the cooling down procedure. It aids in decreasing the body's temperature, removing lactic acid from the muscles and increasing flexibility. Each stretch should be held for a minimum of 10–20 seconds and stretched to the point of mild discomfort but not pain. Each muscle used in mid-high-intensity exercise should then be stretched during the cool-down.

Half-time cooling down 
This is a popular process for elite sporting clubs and athletes. It involves using either ice vests, cooling products or manually cooling down the body through gentle light intensity exercise to cool down the body during half time or breaks in an activity or sport. Half-time cooling down has proven to decrease body temperature and increase aerobic performance. Many sporting groups use cooling down jackets during half-time. Australian elite sporting teams such as those in the AFL, Olympic teams, military and elite athletes across all sporting fields use cooling down vests to increase performance and gain a competitive advantage over their competition.

Cardiovascular issues, health, and heart rate

During aerobic exercise, peripheral veins, particularly those within a muscle, dilate to accommodate the increased blood flow through exercising muscle. The skeletal-muscle pump assists in returning blood to the heart and maintaining cardiac output. A sudden cessation of strenuous exercise may cause blood to pool in peripheral dilated veins, which may cause varicose veins. A cool-down period allows a more gradual return to venous tone. The heart will also need to beat faster to adequately oxygenate the body and maintain blood pressure.

It has been hypothesized that individuals who are at risk for cardiovascular disease may develop negative cardiovascular outcomes in the event that cool-downs are not completed following bouts of exercise. However, current clinical evidence disputes this. Reviews on the inclusion of exercise-therapy for management of cardiovascular disease have indicated that chronic exercise instead induces positive long-term adaptions for the cardiovascular system that reduce the risk of death and outcomes requiring hospitalization.

Muscle soreness and injuries 
One study has shown that athletes who perform an appropriate cool-down are less likely to become injured.

Muscular and skeletal injuries have been found to increase when the cool down procedure is neglected. Ankle injuries are one of the most common injuries athletes and participants are at risk of obtaining when the cool down is performed ineffectively or not at all. Injuries are decreased significantly when the cool down is performed for an adequate amount of time compared to only a short period of time.

See also
Warming up
Stretching

References

Physical exercise
Sports medicine